Restraining Bolt is the major-label debut album by alternative rock band Radish, released on April 22, 1997. Ben Kweller, the group's frontman, was only 15 at the time the album was released.

Track listing
Little Pink Stars
Simple Sincerity
Failing and Leaving
Dear Aunt Arctica
Sugar Free
Today's Bargain
The You in Me
Still I Wait
A Promise
Apparition of Purity
My Guitar
Bedtime

References

1997 debut albums
Mercury Records albums